The Gridley Unified School District (GUSD) is a public primary and secondary education school district located in Gridley, California, a suburban town north of Sacramento, California and south of Chico, California. It consists of two elementary schools, one middle school, one high school, and one continuation high school.

High schools

Gridley High School

Gridley High School is one of the two high schools in the Gridley Unified School District. The school was established in 1895 and has had an enrollment of about 600 students in the 2010-2011 school year. The principal of the school is Rikki-Lee Burresch and the vice principal is Dr. Jeneé Corum. The mascot of the school are the Bulldogs.

Middle schools

Sycamore Middle School
Sycamore Middle School is the only middle school in the Gridley Unified School District. The school teaches grades 6-8 and has had about 400 students in the 2010-2011 school year. The principal of the school is Kelly Haight. The mascot of the school are the Bullpups.

Elementary schools

McKinley Primary School
McKinley Primary School is one of the two elementary schools in the Gridley Unified School District.  The school teaches grades K-1 and has had about 340 students in the 2010-2011 school year.  The principal of the school is Kimberly Kemmis.

Wilson Elementary School
Wilson Elementary School is one of the two elementary schools in the Gridley Unified School District.  The school teaches grades 2-5 and has had about 500 students in 2010-2011 school year.  The principal of the school is Dr. Joan Schumann and the vice principal is Rhiannon Treat. The mascot of the school are the Rams.

Continuation schools

Esperanza High School
Esperanza High School is one of the two high schools in the Gridley Unified School District and the only continuation school in the Gridley Unified School District. The school teaches grades 10-12 and has had about 30 students in 2010-2011 school year. The principal of the high school is Dr. Maggie Daugherty and the mascot of the school are the Eagles.

References

External links

 Gridley Unified School District

School districts in Butte County, California
Gridley, California
Education in Butte County, California